The Luhring Augustine Gallery is an art gallery in New York City. The gallery has three locations: Chelsea, Bushwick, and Tribeca. Its principal focus is the representation of an international group of contemporary artists whose diverse practices include painting, drawing, sculpture, video and photography.

History
Luhring Augustine Gallery was founded in 1985 by co-owners Lawrence R. Luhring and Roland J. Augustine. From 1989 until 1992, the gallery also partnered with Galerie Max Hetzler on establishing Luhring Augustine Hetzler in Los Angeles. The  space was located in a refurbished building at 1330 4th Street in Santa Monica.

In 2012, Luhring Augustine opened a space in Bushwick, Brooklyn. In 2020, it opened a new  space in Tribeca.

The gallery is a member of the Art Dealers Association of America (ADAA). Roland Augustine served as president of the ADAA from 2006 to 2009.

Artists
Each artist of the gallery has exhibited widely in museum and gallery contexts and has been regularly included in international exhibitions such as the Venice Bienniale, The Carnegie International, and Documenta. The exhibition program is best characterized by its adherence to a rigorous curatorial model that has incorporated critical monographic exhibitions such as Marcel Duchamp (1987), Gerhard Richter (1995) and Donald Judd (1999), which have served as historical antecedents for the contemporary program of the gallery.

Among others, Luhring Augustine Gallery has been representing the following living artists: 
 Janine Antoni
 Charles Atlas
 Larry Clark
 Lee Friedlander (since 2019)
 Sanya Kantarovsky (since 2017)
 Allison Katz (since 2020)
 Ragnar Kjartansson
 Jason Moran
 Reinhard Mucha
 Pipilotti Rist
 Philip Taaffe (since 2012)
 Salman Toor (since 2020)
 Oscar Tuazon
 Rachel Whiteread (since 1992)
 Christopher Wool

In addition to living artists, Luhring Augustine Gallery also handles the estates of the following: 
 Lygia Clark (since 2017)
 Jeremy Moon (since 2017)
 Tunga

Luhring Augustine Gallery has in the past represented the following:
 Allison Katz (2020–2022)
 Simone Leigh (until 2020)
 Glenn Ligon (2009-2019) 
 Daidō Moriyama (until 2019)
 Josh Smith (until 2017)
 Gregory Crewdson
 Joel Sternfeld

Since its founding, Luhring Augustine Gallery has also specialized in the resale of select works of art from the 20th century by artists such as Pablo Picasso, Jackson Pollock, Andy Warhol, Gerhard Richter and Sigmar Polke.

Notable exhibitions
Janine Antoni's work Gnaw: Lard or Gnaw: Chocolate, the artist gnawing on lard and chocolate and turning them into lipsticks and chocolate boxes, was first exhibited at the gallery in 1992. Paul McCarthy's 1996 installation at the gallery, Yaa-Hoo, featured mechanized mannequins performing sexual acts.

In addition to exhibiting work of modern and contemporary artists, Luhring Augustine has hosted two historical exhibitions of Medieval Art, working in collaboration with Sam Fogg Gallery: Of Earth and Heaven (2018) and Gothic Spirit (2020).

References

External links

 Luhring Augustine Gallery website

Contemporary art galleries in the United States
Art museums and galleries in Manhattan
Art galleries established in 1985
1985 establishments in New York City